Taiping Aerodrome  is an aerodrome in Taiping, Larut, Matang and Selama, Perak, Malaysia. It is located at Jalan Muzaffar Shah formerly Creagh Road, Assam Kumbang and also called Tekah Airstrip. The airport was built in early 1929, this wooden structure aerodrome was the first airfield in the state of Perak and also in Peninsular Malaysia.

Taiping Airport is the oldest airstrip in Malaysia. It was built by the British in 1929 for non-military use. Along with Alor Star Airport which was built in the same year, it was one of the earliest airports in Malaya. However, in 1933 more airports were built in Singapore, Selangor and Penang, and the Taiping Airport was no longer important.

In February 2007, the airport was chosen to be the hub for the Global Flying Hospitals, GFH. However, in July 2007, it was decided that Taiping Airport was not suitable as the flying hub, and the Chairman of GFH, Neill Newton, announced a new location will be selected, but not in Malaysia.

History
The Taiping Airport which is located in Assam Kumbang also called Tekah Airport. The airport was built in 1929 and claimed as the first airport officially established in Federated Malay States and also in South East Asia. The airport was not as important when compared to other airports that were established after the first at Taiping. Besides, serving as a commercial airport for the use of the British officers and European merchants it also served as the airstrip for the Royal Malaysian Air Force (RMAF). The airport served short-distance destinations such as to Alor Star, Kuala Lumpur and Penang. The Penang to Singapore flight routes runs a daily stop by at the Taiping Airport. The first Malaya airway company, the Wearne Air Service Company made a daily flight to Taiping, to deliver newspapers to the town. After the end of the Japanese Occupation flight to other Malay states were cancelled and the airport only served flights to other airports within the Perak state, and only the Ipoh Airport was authorized to serve flights to other states. The airport also achieved fame through the famous American aviator, Amelia Earhart in 1937, when she was doing her world flight. Amelia Earhart was flying between Thailand and Singapore and permission to land at Taiping Airport was granted on 7 June 1937 by the then Resident-General of Malaya. The airport also marked was significant in the history of Malaysia, when Sukarno and Mohammad Hatta later became the president and vice-president of Indonesia landed at the airport on 12 August 1945 for a meeting with Dr. Burhanuddin al-Helmy and Ibrahim Yaakub who were leaders of a political party named KRIS to talk about the possibility of joining Malaya with Indonesia, when Indonesia achieved independence. The meeting was arranged by the Japanese officers during the World War II. However, the plan was never succeed and Indonesia announced its independence without Malaya.

In February 2007, the Chief State Minister of Perak, Datuk Seri Tajol Rosli Mohd Ghazali announced that the airport had been chosen as the hub for Global Flying Hospitals (GHF), which is an international organization that brings humanitarian medical support to developing nations. However, the plan was not carried out, because the runway at the airport was too short (about 200 feet long) to accommodate the GFH's planes, as the GFH is using the Airbus A320. The GFH is now stationed at the Subang Airport.

On 22 August 2014, a military helicopter EC725 Super Cougar owned by Royal Malaysian Air Force which bring a funeral victims of Malaysia Airlines Flight 17 arrived and landed safely in Taiping Airport at 12:35 PM for the burial of the victims at Al-Hidayah Muslim Cemetery.

See also

List of airports in Malaysia

References

External links
Eugene Khoo, 2007 A History of Taiping, Malaysia
Prof. Khoo Kay Kim, 2003, The Development of Taiping From 1876 Until World War II: Taiping The Vibrant Years, 
News about development of Taiping Airport

Airports in Perak
Airports established in 1929